Joplin is an unincorporated community and former town in Prince William County, Virginia. The town was located on land taken to form Chopawamsic Recreational Demonstration Area and is now part of Prince William Forest Park, a National Park Service property located adjacent to Marine Corps Base Quantico.  The remains of the town, now just a collection of homes, lies on a stretch of Va. 619, Joplin Road, about 3 miles west of Dumfries.

References

See also
Former counties, cities, and towns of Virginia

Geography of Prince William County, Virginia
Ghost towns in Virginia